María Dolores Martínez (born 16 May 1978) is an Argentine political scientist and politician, currently serving as National Deputy elected in the City of Buenos Aires since 2019. She is a member of the Radical Civic Union (UCR).

Early life and career
Martínez was born on 16 May 1978 in Andalgalá, Catamarca Province. She studied Political Science at the University of Buenos Aires, graduating in 2016. Martínez is in a relationship with Marcelo Sances and has two children.

Political career
Martínez was worked in the National Congress of Argentina since 1999, first as a legislative aide at the Radical Civic Union parliamentary bloc from 1999 to 2012, and then as parliamentary secretary in the UNEN Suma+ bloc from 2013 to 2015. In 2016, she was appointed director of Innovation, Transparency, and Democratic Strengthening of the Chamber of Deputies. She belongs to the Evolución group within the UCR, led by Martín Lousteau.

She ran for a seat in the Chamber of Deputies in the 2019 legislative election, as the sixth candidate in the Juntos por el Cambio list in Buenos Aires. The list was the most voted in the general election, with 53.02% of the vote, and Martínez was elected.

As a national deputy, Martínez formed part of the parliamentary commissions on Petitions, Powers and Norms, National Defense, Maritime Interests, Labour Legislation, Freedom of Expression, Foreign Affairs and Worship, Housing and Urban Planning, Culture, and Communications. She was supporter of the legalization of abortion in Argentina, voting in favour of the 2020 Voluntary Interruption of Pregnancy bill that passed the Argentine Congress 2020.

References

External links
Profile on the official website of the Chamber of Deputies (in Spanish)

Living people
1978 births
Argentine political scientists
Women political scientists
Members of the Argentine Chamber of Deputies elected in Buenos Aires
Women members of the Argentine Chamber of Deputies
People from Catamarca Province
Politicians from Buenos Aires
Radical Civic Union politicians
University of Buenos Aires alumni
21st-century Argentine politicians
21st-century Argentine women politicians